Rebel Riddim is the official debut album from Dog Boy, released on April 3, 2007 with Suburban Noize Records. This album was most notable for its mixture of a variety of styles used worldwide including the odd mix of reggae and punk rock. As of May 12, 2007 Rebel Riddim reached #11 on the Billboard's Top Reggae Albums chart.

Track listing

References

2007 debut albums
Dog Boy albums